The Zeitpyramide is a work of public art by Manfred Laber under construction in Wemding, Germany. The pyramid, begun in 1993, at the 1,200th anniversary of Wemding, will take another  years to complete and is scheduled to be finished in the year 3183. In , the project is scheduled to be  complete with the first  of its 120 concrete blocks scheduled to have been placed.

Concept 
The town of Wemding dates back to the year 793 and celebrated its 1,200th anniversary in 1993. The Zeitpyramide was conceived by Manfred Laber (a local artist) in June 1993 to mark this 1,200-year period and to give people a sense of what the span of 1,200 years really means. One block is scheduled to be placed every ten years, taking 1,190 years (see Fencepost error) in total. The material of the blocks used is not fixed and may be altered in future generations depending on availability.

Artist 
Manfred Laber was born in Wemding in 1932 and studied painting at the Hochschule für Bildende Künste in Berlin in the 1950s. He has other artwork on permanent display on the Isla San Antonio, and in Alcanar, Spain, and Mormoiron, France. Alcanar is also his part-time place of residence.

Construction

Current progress 
The pyramid, as far as it exists today, is on a concrete pad on a rounded hilltop, the Robertshöhe, on the northern edge of Wemding. The first block was placed in October 1993. The  third and most recent block was placed at 16:14 on 29 June 2013. Following the schedule, the fourth block is to be placed in 2023.

The project's initial financing was mostly achieved through donations by local companies, which, for example, supplied the materials for the concrete slab for free.  The project is administrated by a foundation based in Wemding.

Speculative future progress 
A model of the final artwork is exhibited at Wemding, at the Haus des Gastes.

It is unknown if or how the project would be continued if the administrative foundation stopped existing. Assuming the project proceeded according to plan, it would naturally fall into stages by tier.

Base tier 

Second tier 
The planned second layer will consist of 36 blocks, in a 6 by 6 format with a presumptive stage completion date of 2983. This is the first layer that requires a block be placed atop another block, which would require a crane or some form of scaffolding such as an earthen ramp used as an incline.

Third tier 
The planned third layer will consist of 16 blocks arranged in 4 by 4 with a presumptive stage completion date of 3143.

Fourth tier 
The planned final, fourth layer consists of 4 blocks, arranged in 2 by 2, upon completion of which the structure will be finished, having taken just shy of a decade less time to build than Wemding had been in existence at the time that the first block was laid.

Completion 

References

External links 
 Official Zeitpyramide website
 Official website of the city of Wemding
 Website of the city of Wemding about the project

4th millennium
Brutalist architecture
Buildings and structures in Donau-Ries
Buildings and structures under construction in Germany
German art
Outdoor sculptures in Germany
Public art in Germany
Pyramids in Germany
Unfinished sculptures